Thomas Singleton, DD (25 July 1783 –  13 March 1842) was Archdeacon of Northumberland  from 1826 until his death.

The grandson of Francis Grose and son of Anketell Singleton (Governor of Landguard Fort from 1766 to 1804)  he was educated at Eton College and Corpus Christi College, Cambridge and ordained in 1807. He was Chaplain to the Duke of Northumberland 
and Rector of  Elsdon, Northumberland before his Archdeacon's appointment.

References

Notes

1783 births
1842 deaths
People educated at Eton College
Alumni of Corpus Christi College, Cambridge
Archdeacons of Northumberland